Glenbarr is a village in Argyll and Bute, Scotland.  It lies on the west coast of the Kintyre peninsula.

Glenbarr Abbey
Nearby is Glenbarr Abbey, an 18th-century residence, built by Col. Matthew Macalister, 1st Laird of Glenbarr. Today it serves as a visitor centre for the history of Clan MacAlister.

References

Clan MacAlister
Villages in Kintyre